Mompiche is a small beach town located on the coast of Ecuador in South America. It is known for its scenic beauty and unique geography, with a long stretch of black sand beach surrounded by lush vegetation and hills.

The area has a rich history, dating back to the indigenous people who lived there before the arrival of the Spanish. Mompiche was a major center for trade and commerce for the indigenous Moche people, and evidence of their presence can still be seen in the form of petroglyphs and other artifacts that have been found in the area.

When the Spanish arrived in the 16th century, they brought with them Christianity and enslaved the indigenous population, forcing them to work in the mines and on the plantations. In the following centuries, the area saw a great deal of economic and social changes, including the growth of fishing and agriculture, as well as the arrival of African slaves who were brought to work on the sugar and cacao plantations.

Today, Mompiche is a popular tourist destination, attracting visitors from around the world who come to enjoy its natural beauty and rich cultural heritage. Despite its growing popularity, the town has managed to retain its traditional character, and many of its buildings and structures have been preserved to provide a glimpse into its past.

Location 
Located in the Esmeraldas region of North Western Ecuador, Mompiche is located at the south end of a bay that encompasses the city of San Francisco in the north, Muisne and La Mancha in the center, and Mompiche in the south.

Populated places in Esmeraldas Province